Realm of Chaos: Slaves to Darkness is the second album by British death metal band Bolt Thrower. It was recorded at Loco studios in April 1989 and engineered by Tim Lewis. It was mixed at Slaughterhouse Studios in July 1989 and engineered by Colin Richardson. It is produced by Bolt Thrower and Digby Pearson. The cover artwork was produced by Games Workshop. The whole album is closely tied to Games Workshop's Warhammer 40,000 game background and Realm of Chaos: Slaves to Darkness was the title of a gaming book by Games Workshop released in 1988.

The album was released on Earache Records: Mosh 13 in 1989. In 2005 a re-issue was released by Earache, featuring new artwork. The band advises not to buy the re-issue, as they have not been involved and will not get royalties.

Realm of Chaos displays a progression from its previous output in speed and riffage. There is a strong focus on blast beats in many of the songs, with chaotic guitar soloing. Nevertheless, the signature heavy riffing is also apparent.

Track listing
All songs written by Bolt Thrower.

Personnel
Bolt Thrower
 Karl Willetts – Vocals
 Gavin Ward – Guitars
 Barry Thomson – Guitars
 Andrew Whale – Drums
 Jo Bench – Bass guitar

Production
 Digby Pearson - Production
 Colin Richardson - Mix
 John Blanche - Art direction
 Dave Lund - Graphic Design
 John Sibbick - Front cover artwork
 Addy Jones - Photography

References 

1989 albums
Bolt Thrower albums
Earache Records albums
Warhammer 40,000